The second presidency of Luiz Inácio Lula da Silva started on 1 January 2023, when he was inaugurated as the 39th President of Brazil. Lula was elected for a third term as President of Brazil on 30 October 2022, by obtaining 50.9% of the valid votes in the 2022 Brazilian general election, defeating incumbent Jair Bolsonaro.

Background

On 20 May 2021, in an interview with French magazine Paris Match, Lula confirmed that he was a pre-candidate for the next year's elections.

The Workers' Party national committee, on 13 April 2022, approved the nomination of former Governor of São Paulo Geraldo Alckmin (PSB) for vice president. The ticket was officialized on 7 May, in a coalition formed by the Brazil of Hope Federation (formed by Workers' Party, Communist Party of Brazil and Green Party), Brazilian Socialist Party, Solidarity and PSOL REDE Federation. With the withdrawal of André Janones on 4 August, the ticket received official support of Avante and Agir.

On 2 October, the day of the first round, Lula placed first with 48.43% of the valid votes, classifying for a runoff with Jair Bolsonaro, who garnered 43.20% of the valid votes. Lula was elected in the second round, on 30 October, being the first President of Brazil elect for three terms and the first since Getúlio Vargas to be elect for a non-consecutive term. He was inaugurated on 1 January 2023.

On 1 January 2023 Lula and Geraldo Alckmin were sworn in as president and vice-president of Brazil, respectively, for the time between January 1, 2023, and January 4, 2027.

Government plan

Lula has as some of his main compromises in his government plan: the reconstruction of the country facing the economic crisis; with democracy, sovereignty, and peace; with the economic development and stability; with the fight against poverty; with education; with the implementation of a National System of Culture and extension of housing programs.

Planned executive decisions
Lula's administration planned several decisions reversing those made by Bolsonaro's administration, including:

Withdraw from the Geneva Consensus Declaration
Rejoin the Union of South American Nations and the Community of Latin American and Caribbean States
Restore recognition of Nicolás Maduro as president of Venezuela and reopen the Brazilian embassy in Caracas
Restore goals of reduction of greenhouse gas emissions according to the Paris Agreement
Restore monitoring against deforestation of the Amazon rainforest and illegal mining
Relaunch the Growth Acceleration Program
Relaunch the Minha Casa, Minha Vida program

Transition

In his victory speech, Lula adopted a moderate tone, saying he wants to "pacify the country". The new government will face a very conservative Congress, with many former ministers and people close to the Bolsonarism.

On 1 November 2022, Vice President-elect Geraldo Alckmin was appointed as coordinator of the government-elect transition team. On 3 November, Alckmin and the Chief of Staff of the Presidency, Ciro Nogueira, had a meeting to being the government transition. The Vice President-elect also met with political leaderships, aiming to adjust the federal budget in 2022, in order to enable the objectives of the future administration.

2023 invasion of the Brazilian Congress 

In response to an attack by supporters of former President Bolsonaro on the Praça dos Três Poderes, Lula announced that he had signed a decree declaring a state of emergency in the Federal District until the end of January.

Government actions 
Right after taking office on January 1, 2023, President Lula and his ministers took several measures to revert Bolsonaro's administration policies and/or create policies announced during the election campaign and the transition of power.

Foreign affairs 
Lula stated during the 2022 election campaign and after taking office that his administration will consistently focus on to "bring back Brazil to the world stage", meaning the country will seek to rebuild ties cut or damaged during Bolsonaro's presidency, and expand its foreign relations worldwide. On 9 December 2022 Lula announced that to head the Ministry of Foreign Affairs (Itamaraty) he had chosen Brazilian ambassador, career diplomat and former foreign minister Mauro Vieira. As an effort to empower women diplomats, he picked ambassador and career diplomat Maria Laura da Rocha as Itamaraty's deputy foreign minister and Maria Luiza Ribeiro Viotti as Brazil's ambassador to the US, both the first women to ever hold those positions. More women are also expected to be appointed to top positions.

Americas

Mercosur 
On January 24, 2023, in the city of Buenos Aires, Mauro Vieira, Minister of Foreign Affairs, announced Brazil's return to the Community of Latin American and Caribbean States (CELAC). A day later, during the 7th CELAC summit, president Lula expressed support for a modernization of the South American customs union Mercosur. He also favored creating a common unit of account between Argentina and Brazil which other South American nations could also join to boost regional integration and skip US dollar dominance.

On January 25, during a trip to Uruguay, Lula called for the European Union-Mercosur trade deal to be sealed and a China-Mercosur trade agreement to be explored. On the same day, Lula and Uruguayan president Luis Lacalle Pou held talks over infrastructure projects to be developed in Uruguay, including a joint Uruguayan-Brazilian administration of the Rivera International Airport. On March 9, Uruguayan and Brazilian top officials jointly detailed the said infrastructure projects in Brasilia.

On March 10, Brazil invited Paraguay and Uruguay to join the works of the G20 ahead of the 2024 G20 Brazil Summit, as Brazilian rotating presidency in the group begins on December 1st, 2023.

Argentina 
After assuming the presidency, Lula made his first trip abroad to Buenos Aires, where he announced that Brazil would resume relations in Latin America and that the government would be willing to return to finance works in neighboring countries through the BNDES. Lula also defended the construction of a gas pipeline between Brazil and Argentina to transport the shale gas extracted in the Vaca Muerta field. The idea was criticized by some experts, as the project may cause damage to the region's environment. The announcement also generated several criticisms from economists, as this practice has already caused the country to suffer from defaults in the past.

Mexico 
On March 1, Brazilian presidential office said Mexican president Andres Manuel Lopez Obrador invited Lula to visit Mexico and discuss expanding economic cooperation between Mexico and Brazil including the removal of trade tariffs between their countries.

United States 
On January 9, 2023, US president Joe Biden invited Lula to meet him in Washington, D.C. in February 2023 following a phone conversation between them on the 2023 Brazilian Congress attack. On January 31, White House press secretary Karine Jean-Pierre confirmed the meeting adding that it will address "U.S. support of Brazil's democracy and how the two countries can continue to work together to promote inclusion and democratic values in the region and around the world". Climate change, migration, economic development and security matters will also be discussed. On February 9, Lula, and a delegation including his Foreign Affairs special advisor Celso Amorim, Foreign minister Mauro Vieira, Finance minister Fernando Haddad, Racial Equality minister Anielle Franco, Environment minister Marina Silva, traveled to the US. On the following day, Lula met with US Senator Bernie Sanders and Democratic House Representatives Alexandria Ocasio-Cortez, Pramila Jayapal, Sheila Jackson Lee, Brad Sherman and Ro Khanna in the morning before he visited and held talks with US president Joe Biden at the White House in the afternoon. He invited the US to join Brazil in a new global climate governance.

On February 28, Brazilian Environment minister Marina Silva met with John Kerry, the White House envoy for climate change during his visit to Brazil, and announed the resumption of a US-Brazil environment group created in 2015 to debate energy transition, low carbon economy, climate change mitigation, indigenous peoples protection and bioconomy among others between the two countries. Nevertheless, no contribution to the Amazon Fund was announced by Kerry during the visit.

Europe

Germany 

On January 20, 2023, Germany ambassador to Brazil Heiko Thoms confirmed Chancellor Olaf Scholz would visit Brazil on January 30. According to a statement, the main subjects to be addressed would be environment, including the re-establishment of the Amazon Fund, and trade between Germany and Brazil . On January 30, Germany development minister Svenja Schulze announced the country will donate € 204 million (USD 222 million) to Brazil aiming to help restore farming degraded areas through low-interest rate loans, make fresh monetary contributions to the Amazon Fund and provide local aid to Brazilian states in the Amazon region; new sustainable agriculture and green hydrogen projects in Brazil are also being looked upon by the German government according to Schulze. During the meeting with Scholz, Lula proposed creating a group of some countries including India, Indonesia and China in order to mediate a peace process in the Russian-Ukrainian war.

France 
On February 8, French Foreign Minister minister Catherine Colonna met with President Lula and stated that "Brazil is one of the main actors in the global stage and its comeback is highly expected" and that France and Brazil share a strong, centuries-old relationship. She also expressed support for a Brazilian OECD membership and said that both France and the European Union are considering monetary contributions to the Amazon Fund.

On February 11, French president Emmanuel Macron expressed approval for a peace plan on the Russian-Ukrainian war proposed by Lula which consists of creating a group of countries not involved in the conflict to mediate a peace process.

Asia

China 
On February 17, Reuters reported President Lula will meet with Chinese president Xi Jinping during a four-day trip to China on March 28 to hold talks about trade, including green economy, digital inclusion, reindustrialization and the Russian-Ukrainian war. He will also likely discuss former Brazilian president Dilma Rousseff appointment to the presidency of the New Development Bank (NDB), which NDB members have reportedly agreed with already.

Oceania

Australia 
On March 10, 2022, Brazil's Agriculture Ministry announced the country was holding talks with Australia about agricultural trade agreements regarding wheat, barley and pork trade as well as sustainable agriculture including research projects between both countries.

Human rights 
On January 8, 2023, Foreign Minister Mauro Vieira announced Brazil rejoined the Global Compact for Migration from which the Bolsonaro administration withdrew on January 9, 2019 The UNHCR welcomed the decision stating that ensures "the people's rights and the means so that migrants and refugees can contribute positively to the host countries". According to the Foreign Ministry, the parties mutual benefits of the pact also reflects on the "Brazilian government's commitment to the protection and promotion of the rights of more than 4 million Brazilians living abroad".

Abortion 
On January 17, Lula withdrew Brazil from the Geneva Consensus Declaration on Promoting Women's Health and Strengthening the Family. Signed by Bolsonaro in 2020, the document stated that "there is no international right to abortion nor any international obligation on the part of States to finance or facilitate abortion". The document, which also limits families to only those formed by heterosexual couples, was signed by countries such as Saudi Arabia, Uganda, Egypt, Indonesia, Hungary, the United Arab Emirates, Sudan and Belarus, as well as the United States (which left the declaration in 2021), totaling 31 countries.

Environment 
On November 1, 2022, the COP27 host Egypt invited then President-elect Lula to visit the summit which raised hopes among climate activists and international organizations officials that Brazil will strengthen its environmental policies. Lula accepted the invitation and, while attending the COP27, promised to fight for a zero deforestation in the Amazon and other biomes. He also promised to have a United Nations Climate Change Conference held in the Amazon. On 11 January 2023, Lula announced Brazil was making an official bid for the Brazilian city of Belém to host the COP 30.

On January 4, 2023, it was reported that Brazil was seeking an Amazon summit between members of the Amazon Cooperation Treaty Organization (ACTO) and other non-members which was reportedly well received by the ACTO countries. On January 26, Lula invited French president Emmanuel Macron to attend the ACTO summit due to the French department of French Guiana location in the Amazon region.

International aid 
On February 8, 2023, President Lula authorized immediate emergency aid, including several fire brigades, Brazilian Air Force airtankers and other emergency services and equipment to be sent to Chile after severe wildfires broke out across the country. In the following day, Brazil sent aid, rescue crews, including sniffer dogs, among other equipments and staff to Turkey and Syria following the 2023 Turkey-Syria earthquake.

Domestic affairs 
On the same day of his inauguration, Lula signed his first decrees, in an act that became known as "revogaço" (mass repeal of decrees), revoking the previous government's measures involving weapons, environment policies and top officials' data secrecy; According to Environment and Climate Change Minister Marina Silva, another "revogaço" is yet to come. The current "teto de gastos" (debt ceiling) fiscal policy, seen as unpractical by government officials, is also expected to be replaced with other debt limit.

On January 2, 2023, more "revogaços" happened, measures included stopping the privatization process of eight state-owned companies (including the Correios and Petrobras); almost a thousand appointees in federal posts linked in some way to the Bolsonaro government were dismissed. On January 6, Lula signed into law a bill creating the Day of the Traditional African Religions. On January 11, Lula signed into law another bill, which makes the CPF the only necessary document for identification.

Housing 
On February 14, Lula, alongside the Governor of Bahia Jerônimo Rodrigues, the Chief of Staff of the Presidency Rui Costa, the President of the Caixa Econômica Federal Maria Rita Serrano, the Minister of Transport Renan Filho, the Minister of Cities Jader Filho, as well as state and municipal authorities (such as the mayor of the city and federal/state deputies from Bahia), announced the return of the Minha Casa, Minha Vida program during a visit to the city of Santo Amaro, Bahia; the program will replace the Bolsonaro government's "Casa Verde e Amarela" program (which in turn had replaced Lula's first "Minha Casa, Minha Vida" program), the program is expected to create over 2 million houses for the low-income population by the end of 2026 (the last year of Lula's presidency).

Justice and public security 
On January 11, Lula signed in two bills, the first one created the "National Policy for the Prevention of Self-Mutilation and Suicide", with the objective of giving mental health support for public security and social workers, the second bill deals with equalizing the crime of racial injury to racism.

Environment 
On the day of his inauguration, Lula revoked a decree by Bolsonaro that allowed mining in indigenous lands, which was seen as an incentive to illegal miners. Deforestation in the Brazilian Amazon rainforest fell 61% in January 2023 from a year earlier following a series of anti-logging and anti-mining operations launched by government agencies under Lula, satellite data showed.

Communications 
On January 1, Lula created the Secretary of Digital Policies, whose goal is to "combat disinformation, fake news and hate speech on the internet", as well as to "encourage pluralism", this secretary is subordinated to the Secretary of Social Communication (Secom).

Weapons 
On January 1, 2023, Lula decreed the temporary suspension of authorization for new shooting clubs.

Education 
On January 2, Lula revoked an bill made during the Bolsonaro government, which created schools exclusively for persons with disabilities. On January 11, Lula signed in a bill called the "National Digital Education Policy", which deals with expanding access to digital education in the country.

Healthcare 
On January 20, Lula signed a bill that recognizes community and disease control agents as health professionals. Also on January 20, under pressure from religious entities, Lula created the "Department of Support for Therapeutic Communities", aimed at treating drug addicts; After the measure was criticized by human rights organizations, the Ministry of Social Development and Fight against Hunger announced that it would review the decision. The Brazilian Association of Mental Health had also spoken out against the measure in a repudiation note.

Indigenous affairs 
Upon taking office, Lula also issued the Provisional Measure No. 1,154, of 1 January 2023, which created the Ministry of Indigenous People, and also renamed the Fundação Nacional do Índio (National Indian Foundation – FUNAI) with the name of Fundação Nacional dos Povos Indígenas (National Indigenous People Foundation), in addition to linking this foundation authority to the newly created ministry. He appointed Sônia Guajajara as Indigenous minister, and Joênia Wapixana to head FUNAI.

Yanomami crisis 

On January 20, the Brazilian Ministry of Health declared a national emergency following reports of deaths among Yamomami children due to malnutrition and easily curable diseases. President Luiz Inácio Lula da Silva accused Jair Bolsonaro's administration of having committed genocide against the Yanomami.

Controversies

Appointment of ministers 
Some controversies surrounded the Lula government during the first month of his third term. In early January, the NGO Transparency International, which works worldwide to fight corruption, issued a statement criticizing the government for choosing Waldez Góes as Minister of National Integration, Waldez was previously sentenced to prison for embezzlement. Also in January, it was discovered that Lula's Minister of Tourism, Daniela Carneiro, and her husband, were allegedly involved with militias in Rio de Janeiro.

See also
First presidency of Lula da Silva
List of executive orders by Lula da Silva
Lulism
Politics of Brazil
Workers' Party (Brazil)

References

2023 establishments in Brazil
2020s in Brazilian politics
Silva
Luiz Inácio Lula da Silva